The 50th General Assembly of Nova Scotia represented Nova Scotia between 1970 and February 23, 1974.

Division of seats

There were 46 members of the General Assembly, elected in the 1970 Nova Scotia general election.

List of members

Former members of the 50th General Assembly

References 

Terms of the General Assembly of Nova Scotia
1970 establishments in Nova Scotia
1974 disestablishments in Nova Scotia
20th century in Nova Scotia